Sylvanus Olatunde Williams (16 September 1922 – 28 October 2006) was a Nigerian athlete. He competed in the men's long jump at the 1952 Summer Olympics.

References

1922 births
2006 deaths
Athletes (track and field) at the 1952 Summer Olympics
Nigerian male long jumpers
Olympic athletes of Nigeria
Place of birth missing
Commonwealth Games medallists in athletics
Commonwealth Games bronze medallists for Nigeria
Athletes (track and field) at the 1954 British Empire and Commonwealth Games
Medallists at the 1954 British Empire and Commonwealth Games